Hermann Sailer (born 1 November 1933) is an Austrian sports shooter. He competed at the 1980 Summer Olympics and the 1988 Summer Olympics.

References

1933 births
Living people
Austrian male sport shooters
Olympic shooters of Austria
Shooters at the 1980 Summer Olympics
Shooters at the 1988 Summer Olympics
Sportspeople from Innsbruck
20th-century Austrian people